Ollie Lawrence (born 18 September 1999) is an English professional rugby union player who plays as a centre for Premiership Rugby club Bath.

Early life
Lawrence was born in Birmingham. His father, Michael, played rugby on the wing for Moseley. Lawrence went to a rugby-playing secondary school, Old Swinford Hospital, and then went to sixth form at Bromsgrove School on a scholarship. He played football and cricket, as well as rugby, when young. He joined the Warriors academy by age 15.

Club career
Lawrence burst onto the senior Warriors scene in November 2017 with a try on his first-team debut against Sale Sharks in the Anglo-Welsh Cup at Sixways Stadium. He went on to make three first-team appearances during the 2017–18 season while he impressed for Warriors Under 18s and Worcester Cavaliers - the latter where he scored two tries in six appearances which also included four try assists in a single game against Sale Jets.

Lawrence continued his impressive progress in the 2018-19 campaign when he made fourteen senior appearances and scored two important tries which helped Warriors to successive EPCR Challenge Cup victories over Ospreys and Stade Français.

On 5 December 2018, Lawrence signed his first professional contract to stay with Worcester and was subsequently promoted to the senior squad from the 2019–20 season. He scored a first-half try hat-trick in just ten minutes against Enisei-STM in the European Challenge Cup in January 2020 and a try against Wasps on his first Premiership start later that month. On 22 June 2020, Lawrence signed another contract extension with Worcester on an undisclosed length.

In May 2022 Lawrence was a member of the Warriors side that beat London Irish in the final of the 2022 Premiership Rugby Cup to win Worcester their first ever top-flight trophy.

On 5 October 2022, Lawrence had his contract terminated at Worcester due to liquidation of the company to which they were contracted. 
After initially joining Bath on a short-term loan due to uncertainty around the future of Worcester Warriors, Lawrence signed a long-term deal with the club  in October 2022.

International career
Lawrence first represented England at U16 level against Wales where he scored two tries and was awarded man of the match.
In 2018 Lawrence scored a try for England under-18 against Wales and also played one game in the 2018 Six Nations Under 20s Championship against Scotland. Later that year he received his first call-up to train with the senior England squad by coach Eddie Jones prior to their summer tour of South Africa. He again represented England in the 2019 Six Nations Under 20s Championship before an ankle injury during the tournament ended his season two months early preventing him from competing at the 2019 World Rugby Under 20 Championship.

Lawrence was again called up to the England senior squad for the completion of the 2020 Six Nations Championship and the subsequent Autumn Nations Cup. On 31 October 2020 he made his senior England debut from the bench in their delayed final Six Nations match against Italy which they won to win the tournament. The following month saw Lawrence make his first start in the opening round of the Autumn Nations Cup against Georgia.

On 10 June 2021 Lawrence was included in the squad for Tests against the United States and Canada. He scored his first try at international level against the US in a 43–29 win but was forced to leave the field early with a head injury and did not appear in their next game against Canada.

International tries

References

External links

England Rugby Profile
Worcester Warriors Profile
Ultimate Rugby Profile

1999 births
Living people
English rugby union players
Worcester Warriors players
Bath Rugby players
People from Bromsgrove
Rugby union centres
England international rugby union players
Rugby union players from Birmingham, West Midlands